Sir John Mowat (January 22, 1859 – January 1, 1935) was a Scotland international rugby union player.

Rugby Union career

Amateur career

He was schooled at Glasgow Academy.

He played as a forward for Glasgow Academicals.

In the 1882-83 season, the Academicals won the Scottish Unofficial Championship jointly with the West of Scotland.

Provincial career

He also represented Glasgow District against Edinburgh District in the 2 December 1882 match.

International career

He was capped twice by Scotland in 1883.

Business career

He became associated with the S. Law and Sons who ran the Moorland Mills in Cleckheaton. He became Chairman of the English Card Clothing Syndicate.

Law career

He was made a Justice of the Peace for the West Riding area.

Charity work

He was a benefactor of many Yorkshire charities.

He donated to Bradford Infirmary and the Yorkshire Cancer Campaign Fund.

He donated a library to Spenborough valued at £20,000 at the time.

He assisted the local Yorkshire European War Committee Fund during the Great War.

Politics

He was a one-time President of the Spen Valley Liberal Association.

Knighthood

He was given a knighthood. He was made a baronet in 1932 due to his public services in the West Riding of Yorkshire.

Family

He was a son of Baillie John Mowat of Glasgow.

His heir was Lieutanent Colonel Alfred Law Mowat. Mowat lost his younger son John Graham Mowat in the Great War.

Death

Mowat died in 1935 leaving an estate of £201,535 pounds, 15 shillings and 3 pence.

References

1935 deaths
1858 births
Scottish rugby union players
Scotland international rugby union players
Rugby union forwards
Glasgow District (rugby union) players
Glasgow Academicals rugby union players
Rugby union players from Glasgow